Khusropur Station, station code KOO, is a railway station in the Danapur railway  division of East Central Railway. Khusropur is connected to metropolitan areas of India, by the Delhi–Kolkata main line via Mugalsarai–Patna route. Khusropur is located in Patna district in the Indian state of Bihar. Due to its location on the Howrah–Patna–Mughalsarai main line many Patna, Barauni bound express trains coming from Howrah, Sealdah stop here.

Facilities 
The major facilities available are waiting rooms, vehicle parking. The vehicles are allowed to enter the station premises. The station also has STD/ISD/PCO Telephone booth, toilets, tea stall and book stall.

Platforms
There are two platforms which are interconnected with a foot overbridge (FOB).

Trains 

Many passenger and express trains serve Khusropur Station.

Nearest airport
The nearest airports to Khusropur Station are:
Lok Nayak Jayaprakash Airport, Patna 
Gorakhpur Airport, Gorakhpur  
Gaya Airport 
Netaji Subhash Chandra Bose International Airport, Kolkata

References

External links 

 Khusropur Station Map
 Official website of the Patna district

Railway stations in Patna district
Danapur railway division